Captain Sir Harold Malcolm Bullock, 1st Baronet,  (10 July 1889 – 20 June 1966) was a British soldier and Conservative Party politician.

Life
Bullock was the son of iron merchant Frank M. Bullock, of Milhanger, Thursley, Surrey He was educated at Trinity College, Cambridge. Bullock normally went by his middle name of Malcolm rather than his first name. He reached the rank of Captain in the Scots Guards. In 1923 he was elected as the Member of Parliament (MP) for Waterloo in Liverpool, a position he retained until the constituency was abolished in 1950. He was re-elected in the new Crosby constituency at both the 1950 and 1951 general elections, before resigning as an MP in October 1953 due to ill-health. In February 1954 he was created a baronet, of Crosby in the County Palatine of Lancaster.

Bullock married Lady Victoria Alice Louise Primrose, daughter of Edward Stanley, 17th Earl of Derby and widow of Neil Primrose, in 1919. They had one daughter, Priscilla, who married the racehorse trainer Peter Hastings, later Peter Hastings-Bass. Lady Victoria died in a riding accident in November 1927, aged 35. Bullock died in June 1966, aged 76, when the baronetcy became extinct.  His great-granddaughter is Clare Balding.

According to the diaries of close friend and fellow Conservative MP Robert Boothby, Baron Boothby, Bullock was homosexual. At the time homosexuality was illegal in the UK. Bullock was part of a circle of well-known members of British high society who attended Sir Philip Sassoon’s glamorous house parties at Port Lympne Mansion, where it was understood that they could conduct secret relationships in privacy.

References

External links 
 

1889 births
1966 deaths
Alumni of Trinity College, Cambridge
Conservative Party (UK) MPs for English constituencies
Baronets in the Baronetage of the United Kingdom
UK MPs 1923–1924
UK MPs 1924–1929
UK MPs 1929–1931
UK MPs 1931–1935
UK MPs 1935–1945
UK MPs 1945–1950
UK MPs 1950–1951
UK MPs 1951–1955
Gay politicians
English LGBT politicians
Place of birth missing
Place of death missing
Members of the Order of the British Empire
Scots Guards officers
LGBT members of the Parliament of the United Kingdom
LGBT military personnel